The Michinoku Toll Road (みちのく有料道路 Michinoku Yūryōdōro) is a two-lane toll road in Aomori Prefecture connecting the cities Aomori and Hachinohe via Shichinohe. It serves as an alternative to Japan National Route 4, bypassing the towns Hiranai and Noheji by cutting directly through the Hakkōda Mountains and other mountains of the northern Ōu Mountain Range. The road is managed by the Aomori Prefecture Road Corporation and is numbered E4A as an extension of the Tōhoku Expressway.

Tolls

The toll gate for the Michinoku Toll Road does not accept ETC payment. The tolls are set to expire in 2029.
Standard-sized car: ¥850
Large vehicles with 4 axles or less: ¥1300
Large vehicles with 5 or more axles: ¥3020
Kei car: ¥640
Light vehicles, etc.: ¥80

Route description
From Aomori, the Michinoku Toll Road begins 2 kilometers east of the Aomori-higashi Interchange. The connection between the two routes is made by Aomori Prefecture Route 123, which makes its way north to Hiranai at the beginning of the Michinoku Toll Road. The speed limit for the toll road is 60 km/h. As it ascends into the Hakkoda Mountains heading east, going through a short tunnel. Just ahead of the tunnel is the road's toll booth. There are two gates servicing traffic in each direction. After the booth, the route continues ascending until it reaches the 3 kilometer long Michinoku Tunnel at 875 feet above sea level. This tunnel parallels the Hakkōda Tunnel, the longest double-tracked, single-tube terrestrial railway tunnel in the world. In the tunnel, the speed limit drops to 50 km/h and vehicles under 50cc are not allowed use it. At the halfway point of the tunnel drivers cross from Aomori to Schichinohe. After the tunnel the road crosses over and meets Aomori Prefecture Route 242. This road can be used to bypass the toll gate, albeit by meandering through the mountains on a gravel road and are seldom used due to the difficulty to pass through. Heading east Aomori Route 242 runs concurrent or parallel to the toll road. However, these parallel roads are hardly used at the moment, and there are places where it is extremely difficult to pass through. From the tunnel onward, the route descends from the mountains making its way to its end at a red bridge over the Shichinohe River. The road continues from here solely as Aomori Route 242 to National Route 4.

History
The Michinoku Toll Road opened on November 13, 1980 at a cost of ¥21 billion. 
Before the opening of the Sakanashi Tunnel on the Tōhoku Expressway in 1986, the toll road was utilized the main expressway route connecting Aomori and Morioka. There was a rest stop near the toll gate, but it was removed in 2009. On January 19, 2010 it was decided to extended the tolling period until 2029 due to issues paying off debts incurred.
From February 1 to 2, 2012, the road was made free to through traffic from Aomori to Shichinohe because of heavy snowfall along National Route 4 in Hiranai and Noheji.

Future
The Michinoku Toll Road will meet the Kamikita Expressway at National Route 4 in Shichinohe. This will give direct access to the Daini-Michinoku Toll Road, and the Hachinohe Expressway as a single highway connecting the Hachinohe and Aomori Expressways. There are no plans yet to upgrade the connection between the Michinoku Toll Road and Aomori Expressway. However, the highway will function as a single extension of the Tōhoku Expressway with sections managed by both the Aomori Prefecture Road Corporation and East Nippon Expressway Company based on who built them.

Junction list

The entire toll road is in Aomori Prefecture.

See also

 Aomori Expressway
 Kamikita Expressway
 Daini-Michinoku Toll Road
 Hachinohe Expressway
 Tōhoku Expressway

External links 

 East Nippon Expressway Company

References

Toll roads in Japan
Roads in Aomori Prefecture
1980 establishments in Japan